Grover is an unincorporated community in Bradford County, Pennsylvania, United States.

ZIP code information
Grover has a post office with ZIP code 17735. In 2013 the post office was converted to a remotely managed status under the direction of the Canton Post Office.

References

Unincorporated communities in Bradford County, Pennsylvania
Unincorporated communities in Pennsylvania